André Osterberger (26 October 1920 – 18 January 2009) was a French athlete. He competed in the men's hammer throw at the 1952 Summer Olympics.

References

External links
 

1920 births
2009 deaths
Athletes (track and field) at the 1952 Summer Olympics
French male hammer throwers
Olympic athletes of France
Sportspeople from Côte-d'Or